Events in the year 1890 in Belgium.

Incumbents
Monarch - Leopold II
Prime Minister: Auguste Marie François Beernaert

Events
 25 May – Provincial elections
 27 May – Belgian National Day is made a legal holiday
 10 June – Belgian general election, 1890
 2 July – Brussels Conference Act of 1890 (anti-slavery convention)
 21 July – first observance of 21 July as Belgian National Day; king lays the foundation stone of the Arcade du Cinquantenaire in Brussels.
 16 to 21 August – Seventh International Eucharistic Congress held in Antwerp, with an estimated 150,000 participants.
 establishment of Sint-Leocollege in Bruges

Publications
 Sylvain Balau, Soixante-dix ans d'histoire contemporaine de Belgique (1815-1884), 3rd edition, with a preface by Charles Woeste (Liège, L. Grandmont-Donders, and Ghent, A. Siffer).
 Prosper de Haulleville, Les nonciatures apostoliques en Belgique depuis 1830
 Paul Fredericq and Henrietta Leonard, The Study of History in Holland and Belgium (Johns Hopkins University Press)
 Iwan Gilkin, La Damnation de l'artiste (Brussels, Edmond Deman)
 Alexis Marie Gochet, Les Congolais: leurs moeurs et usages. Histoire, géographie et ethnographie de l'état indépendant du Congo (Liège, H. Dessain)
 Philippe Kervyn de Volkaersbeke, La Lutte de l'Irlande (Lille, Société de Saint-Augustin)

Births
 1 January – Alphonse Six, footballer
 5 March – Ann Codee, actress (died 1961)
 25 June – Camille Tihon, archivist (died 1972)
 10 October – Jan Vanderheyden, film-maker (died 1961)
 13 November – Oscar Blansaer, Olympic athlete (died 1962)

Deaths
 2 March – Eudore Pirmez (born 1830), politician
 22 March – Désiré de Haerne (born 1804), priest
 11 May – Eugène Albert (born 1816), clarinet maker
 23 May – Louis Artan (born 1837), artist
 5 July – Pierre Van Humbeeck (born 1829), politician
 3 September – Willem Linnig the Younger (born 1842), artist
 22 September – Joanna Courtmans (born 1811), writer
 23 October – Charles Verlat (born 1824), painter
 16 November – Jean Auguste Ulric Scheler (born 1819), philologist
 19 December – César De Paepe (born 1841), syndicalist
 21 December – Eugène Anspach (born 1833), governor of the national bank

References

 
1890s in Belgium